La Gloria may refer to:

La Gloria, Cesar, Colombia
La Gloria, Texas, United States
La Gloria, Jim Wells County, Texas
La Gloria, Starr County, Texas
La Gloria, Veracruz, Mexico
La Gloria, Bocas del Toro, Panama
La Gloria, Isla Margarita, a mountain in Venezuela, site of a 1974 airplane crash caused by Tropical Storm Alma
La Gloria (Titian), Museo del Prado, Spain

See also
"Viva La Gloria", a song by Green Day from 21st Century Breakdown